Hit Man Dreams is the second full-length album by No Knife, and the first album after Ryan Ferguson joined the band. It was recorded in 1997 and released on Time Bomb Records.

Track listing 
Your Albatross - 4:13
Charades - 3:50
Hit Man Dreams - 5:17
Jackboots - 3:34
Testing the Model - 2:03
Median - 2:45
Rebuilding Jericho - 4:09
Bad Landing - 6:44
Roped In – Lock On - 3:31
Lex Hit Reset - 4:06
Sweep Away My Shadow - 3:59

References

1997 albums
No Knife albums